Picumnus may refer to:
 Picumnus (mythology), a Roman deity
Picumnus (bird), a bird genus